Minister of Mineral Resources may refer to:

 Minister of Mineral Resources (Manitoba)
 Minister of Mineral Resources (South Africa)

See also
 Ministry of Mineral Resources (Sierra Leone)